Pyatigorsk (Circassian: Псыхуабэ, Psıxwabæ) is a city in Stavropol Krai, Russia located on the Podkumok River, about  from the town of Mineralnye Vody where there is an international airport and about  from Kislovodsk. Since January 19, 2010, it has been the administrative center of the North Caucasian Federal District of Russia. Population:

Overview
The name is derived from the fused Russian words "" (five mountains) and the city is so called because of the five peaks of the Beshtau (which also means five mountains in Turkic) of the Caucasian mountain range overlooking the city. It was founded in 1780, and has been a health spa with mineral springs since 1803. Pyatigorsk is one of the oldest spa resorts in Russia. It is one of 116 historical towns of the Russian Federation.

Russian poet Mikhail Lermontov was shot by Nikolai Martynov in a duel at Pyatigorsk on July 27, 1841. There is a museum in the city devoted to his memory. The Zionist activist Joseph Trumpeldor was born in Pyatigorsk.

History

The writings of the 14th-century Arabian traveler Ibn Battuta included the earliest known mention of the mineral springs. Peter the Great (reigned 1682-1725) fostered the earliest scientific study of them, but the information collected on his expedition has not survived. Interest revived at the end of the 18th century with the foundation of the first Russian settlement (Konstantinogorskaya fortress), erected at Mt. Mashuk in 1780.

The value of the Caucasian mineral waters led to the construction of a resort in 1803, and studies of their medical properties began thereafter: on April 24, Alexander I signed a decree which made the mineral waters state property. Many settlements developed near the springs: first Goryachevodsk (now part of Pyatigorsk) at the bottom of Mt. Mashuk, then Kislovodsk, Yessentuki, and Zheleznovodsk. During the Russian Empire, the settlement was the administrative capital of the Pyatigorsky Otdel of the Terek Oblast.

During World War II the German Wehrmacht temporarily occupied Pyatigorsk. The Einsatzkommando 12 of Einsatzgruppe D had its headquarters in Pyatigorsk in 1942. The German occupation resulted in the killing of many Jewish inhabitants of the region.

Geography
The snow-covered summits of Mount Elbrus are visible to the south.

Climate
The climate of Pyatigorsk falls within humid continental (Dfb) classification under the Köppen-Geiger climate classification system and is characterized by absence of sharp fluctuations of annual and daily temperatures. Spring is cool, with a sharp transition by the summer, and a warm, dry, and long fall. There are an average of ninety-eight sunny days in a year.

Administrative and municipal status
Within the framework of administrative divisions, it is, together with two urban-type settlements (Goryachevodsky and Svobody) and five rural localities, incorporated as the city of krai significance of Pyatigorsk—an administrative unit with the status equal to that of the districts. As a municipal division, the city of krai significance of Pyatigorsk is incorporated as Pyatigorsk Urban Okrug.

Economy
The industry of Pyatigorsk is primarily oriented towards service of the health resort. There is also food industry (a meat-processing plant, a winery, a dairy, a brewery, a confectionery), textiles (clothing, shoe plant, carpet factories), machine industry and metal working (PО Pyatigorskselmash specializes in machines and equipment for aviculture; a special automobile equipment works, an electromechanical plant, etc.); mining, a chemical factory and a ceramics factory who specialize in porcelain and ceramic gifts such as samovars, figurines, vases, and decorative ceramic wall hanging panels.

In 1991, the Pyatigorsk health resort had ten sanatoria, four boarding houses and five sanatoria-preventoria. The number of people who stayed at the health resort within a year totalled about 170,000.

Points of interest

The state memorial estate of Mikhail Lermontov was founded in 1973. It unites all of the Lermontov memorial places in the region: the place where he fought his duel and was killed, a necropolis, Lermontov's small house, Verzilin's houses, the house of Alexander Alyabyev, the Lermontov square, and monument.

The Aeolian harp is a small stone pavilion in the classical style, constructed by the brothers Bernardacci in 1828.

Diana's grotto was built in 1830, in honor of the first ascent of Mount Elbrus.

Pyatigorsk is very well known in the Caucasus region for its excellent restaurants and nightlife, architecture, as well as for its extremely large marketplace. A major thoroughfare is known to locals as "Broadway", which runs through the center of the city, and on which most of the best restaurants, nightclubs, and attractions are located. Broadway is also a popular spot for people watching. The influence of the Caucasus region is felt here most noticeably in the music and cuisine, which incorporate aspects of many former Soviet republics such as Armenia.

Pyatigorsk features prominently in Jonathan Littell's 2009 novel, The Kindly Ones.

Honors
Asteroid 2192 Pyatigoriya discovered in 1972 by Soviet astronomer Tamara Smirnova is named after the city.

Twin towns – sister cities

Pyatigorsk is twinned with:

 Dilijan, Armenia
 Hévíz, Hungary
 Kochi, India
 Panagyurishte, Bulgaria
 Schwerte, Germany
 Trikala, Greece

References

Notes

Sources

External links
Official website of Pyatigorsk 
Website about Pyatigorsk 
Weather in Pyatigorsk
Pyatigorsk city website
BBC News. Scraping by in a Russian resort

 
Cities and towns in Stavropol Krai
Populated places established in 1780
Spa towns in Russia
Terek Oblast
North Caucasian Federal District